Lieutenant Colonel J.A.L Jayasinghe PWV, WWV, RWP, RSP, SF  was an officer of the Special Forces Regiment of the Sri Lanka Army who was twice decorated with the Weera Wickrama Vibhushanaya (WWV) the second highest award for combat bravery in the Sri Lankan Armed Forces. He was killed in November 2008, while leading an eight-man Special Forces team on a covert operation 30 km behind enemy lines into territory held by the Liberation Tigers of Tamil Eelam (LTTE).

Education and family
Jayasinghe was educated at Avissawella President's College (Previously Nava Kanishta Vidyalaya)  and Lumbini College Colombo 05. He was also a member of the school's Rugby team.
He married Kaushalya Rodrigo in January 2008, at the time of his death in November 2008 she was five months pregnant.

Military career
Jayasinghe enlisted to the Regular Force of the Sri Lanka Army on 22 January 1997, as a cadet officer. He received training at the Bangladesh Military Academy, where he followed Course 3 offered by the college. On completion of his training, Jayasinghe was commissioned as a second lieutenant to the 6th Regiment of the Gemunu Watch. He was later selected to undergo Special Forces training. After following Special Forces Training Course–24, which he successfully completed, he received Special Forces credentials following which He was then assigned to the 3rd Special Forces Regiment.

In addition to basic training, Jayasignhe had undergone several specialized training courses, both locally and overseas. These include the successful completion of training courses offered by India, China, United States and Bangladesh. He had also received training in military training centers of the Sri Lanka Army in Minneriya, Ganemulla, Uva Kudaoya and Diyatalawa areas. Jayasinghe was promoted to captain, and later, to the rank of major within a time period of ten years. He had functioned as a platoon commander, company commander and also a commanding officer during this time. 

A recipient of the Weera Wickrama Vibhushanaya (twice), Rana Wickrama Padakkama, Rana Sura Padakkama gallantry medals he had also received the Desha Putra Sammanaya, North and East Operations Medal, Purna Bhumi Padakkama, Sri Lanka Army 50th Anniversary Medal and 50th Independence Anniversary Commemoration Medal.

Jayasinghe was a specialist in long range reconnaissance patrol operations, and had helped achieve many victories for the Sri Lanka Army during the Sri Lankan Civil War. This includes participating in the neutralisation of Vaithilingam Sornalingam, alias Colonel Shankar, a senior commander of the LTTE, its intelligence leader Charles (killed in January 2008), and Sea Tiger Deputy Leader Kangai Amaran in June 2001.

He was posthumously awarded the Parama Weera Vibushanaya on 19 May 2012 during the country's victory day parade by the pعresident of Sri Lanka.

Death
Jayasinghe was killed in November 2008, during a reconnaissance mission in LTTE held territory. Leading an eight-man Special Forces team, he had infiltrated thirty kilometers behind enemy lines into the Oddusudan area in LTTE enemy territory and conducted an attack. After completing the first attack, the team had been moving on to a second target when they were spotted by LTTE cadres. Jayasinghe was wounded in the ensuing confrontation, and his team withdrew to a safer location with their wounded team leader. They were spotted again by the LTTE, and in the second confrontation Jayasinghe was killed, while another member of the eight man team was wounded. 

A rescue operation was later carried out to rescue the Special Forces team, with the assistance of Mi-24 helicopter gunships of the Sri Lanka Air Force. All seven members of the team were extracted, along with Jayasinghe's body. He was posthumously promoted to the rank of lieutenant colonel. His funeral was held in Ukwatta, his home town, on 1 December 2008 with full military honours.

See also
Long Range Reconnaissance Patrol (Sri Lanka)
 Sri Lanka Army Special Forces Regiment
Awards and decorations of the military of Sri Lanka
He was awarded the highest award a military personal could ever take 'Parama Weera Vibushana' Medal on 19 May 2012, for his historical contribution to the mother land.

References

External links
Sri Lanka Army
Ministry of Defence : Sri Lanka
Media Center for National Security : Sri Lanka
SPUR

1974 births
2008 deaths
Sri Lankan Buddhists
Lumbini College alumni
Sri Lankan military personnel killed in action
Gemunu Watch officers
Special Forces Regiment officers
Recipients of the Parama Weera Vibhushanaya
Sri Lankan lieutenant colonels